Käglingeparken is a park in Malmö, Sweden.

References 

Parks in Malmö